Rang is a commune in the Doubs department in the Bourgogne-Franche-Comté region in eastern France.

Geography
It also lies on the Rhône-Rhine Canal.

Population

See also
 Communes of the Doubs department

References

External links

 Rang on the intercommunal Web site of the region 

Communes of Doubs